The Constitutional Party was a political party in Uruguay.

Among its most prominent members were: Martín C. Martínez, Carlos María Ramírez, Pablo de María, José Pedro Ramírez, Juan C. Blanco, Elías Regules and Domingo Aramburú.

Sources
Intellectuals and politics in Uruguay 
Republican ideas in the origins of Uruguayan democracy

External links

Defunct political parties in Uruguay
1880 establishments in Uruguay
1903 disestablishments in Uruguay
Political parties established in 1880
Political parties disestablished in 1903